is a railway station in Inabe, Mie Prefecture, Japan. It is located 25.3 rail kilometres from the terminus of the Sangi Line at Kintetsu-Tomida Station.

Lines
Sangi Railway
Sangi Line

Layout
Nishi-Nojiri Station has a single side platform serving bi-directional traffic. The station is unattended.

Platforms

Adjacent stations

History
Nishi-Nojiri Station was opened on December 23, 1931.

External links

Sangi Railway official home page

Railway stations in Japan opened in 1931
Railway stations in Mie Prefecture